Jonathan Compas (born January 9, 1986) is a former American football center. He was signed by the Oakland Raiders as an undrafted free agent in 2009 after playing college football at UC Davis.

Compas has also played for the Tampa Bay Buccaneers, New England Patriots, and Washington Redskins.

Early years
Compas is the youngest of two children of Gerald and Linda Compas (née Fitzgibbon). He is the grandson of Richard B. Fitzgibbon, Jr. and nephew of Richard B. Fitzgibbon III.

College career
After graduating from Carlsbad High School in 2004, Compas played football at UC Davis. In 2004, he was redshirted and later selected as Scout Defense Player of the Week after the Northern Colorado game. The following year, he started the first six games as right guard, before being sidelined by injury. In 2006, he started all eleven games at right tackle and picked up one tackle (on an interception) early in the third quarter against cross town rival Sacramento State University. That same year he was an All-American pick by The Sporting News. Then in 2007, he earned second consecutive GWFC all-academic honors while managing to start eleven games.

Professional career
Before his career with the Buccaneers, Compas signed with the Oakland Raiders as a free-agent in April 2009. On September 1, 2009, he was claimed off waivers from the Oakland Raiders by Tampa Bay. He was released by the Buccaneers on September 4, 2010. Following his release from the Buccaneers, Compas was picked up by the New England Patriots. Compas holds a masters degree from University of San Diego in business administration.

References

External links
Tampa Bay Buccaneers bio
UC Davis Aggies bio

1986 births
Living people
Sportspeople from Orange, California
American football centers
Sportspeople from Carlsbad, California
Players of American football from California
Tampa Bay Buccaneers players
UC Davis Aggies football players
Oakland Raiders players
New England Patriots players